Nozipho Nkelemba (born 1991), is a South African actress, casting director, director, brand endorser, and scriptwriter. She is best known for the roles in the television serials such as; Rhythm City, Mzansi Love and Heartlines.

Personal life
Nkelemba was born in 1991 in South Africa. She trained performance and directing from the Wits National School of the Arts. Then she completed a degree in Brand Communications from the AAA School of Advertising.

She is married to fellow actor, Richard Lukunku, who appeared in the plays Ashes to Ashes, Rhythm City, and Isidingo. The couple has one son.

Career
Before starting professional acting, she made television appearances with commercials where she played the role of "a girl on a bus" in a commercial for Allan Gray insurance.

In 2006, she appeared in the SABC2 drama Heartlines with the role "Ayanda Sibeko" and as "Mmatsietsi" in the SABC1 anthology miniseries When We Were Black. In the next year, she appeared in the SABC2 mini-series When We Were Black. In 2011, she joined with the third season of the SABC2 parliamentary drama serial 90 Plein Street where she played the role of "Nana". In the same year, she in the feature film The Forgotten Kingdom by playing the role of "Dineo Rachabane". Then in 2012, she joined with e.tv anthology comedy drama Mzansi Love and played the role "Arizona". In the second season of the show, she played the role "Nomsa".

Meanwhile she played the role of "schoolgirl Charlotte" on the e.tv soap opera Rhythm City which became very popular. In 2013, she appeared in two serials: as "Grace" in the second season SABC1 drama Intersexions and then as "Palesa" . In 2014, she acted in the SABC1 mystery thriller Task Force with the role "Zandi". Then in the next year, she joined with Mzansi Magic drama Ya Lla to play the role "Nala". In 2016, she worked as the casting director for the eKasi+ drama serial Hustle. Then in the same year, she became the casting director for the SABC2 telenovela Keeping Score. Apart from that, she also worked as the dialogue and language coach of the show. Then she played the role "Khethi" in the second season of SABC1 drama Dream World. In 2018, she appeared in the SABC1 supernatural anthology Emoyeni by playing the role "Kitso" as well as wrote the script of the show. Later she won the award for the Best Achievement in Scriptwriting in TV Drama category at the South African Film and Television Awards. In 2020, she directed the telenovela Gomora'' and won the Best Achievement in Directing Award in Telenovela at 2021 SAFTAs.

Filmography

References

External links
 IMDb

1991 births
Living people
South African film actresses
South African television actresses
South African stage actresses